Jullovsmorgon (Christmas vacation Morning) was a TV-series for children broadcast by Sveriges Television every morning during the Swedish Christmas holidays. At the mornings during the Swedish summer holidays, a TV-series called Sommarlovsmorgon (Summer holiday Morning) is broadcast. The 1st "Jullovsmorgon" Gomorron jul with Anita och Televinken was broadcast during the 1970/1971 Christmas and the 39th and last "Jullovsmorgon" Träskändan was broadcast during the 2008/2009 Christmas.

Series 
1970/1971 – Gomorron jul with Anita och Televinken
1971/1972–1973/1974 – Där är du, här är jag with Beppe Wolgers
1974/1975 – Jul på Sverige with Jan Bergquist
1975/1976 – Hej jul with Eva Rydberg
1976/1977 – Trazan & Banarne
1977/1978 – Ville, Valle och Viktor
1978/1979 – Julkul med Staffan och Bengt with Staffan Ling and Bengt Andersson
1979/1980 – Clara, Valle & Sillen
1980/1981–1981/1982 – Jul igen hos Julofsson
1982/1983 – Trazan & Banarne
1983/1984 – TV-piraterna
1984/1985 – Toffelhjältarna
1985/1986 – Morgonstjärnan
1986/1987 – Toffelhjältarna går igen
1987/1988 – Sesam
1988/1989 (even 1995/1996) – Midvinterbio with Lennart R. Svensson
1989/1990 – Midvinterbio with Anders Forsslund
1990/1991–1991–1992 – Pippi Pelikan
1992/1993 – Jullovsmorgon
1993/1994 – Jullovsmorgon with Carina Molander
1994/1995 – Jullovsmorgon with Anita Lindman Lamm
1996/1997 – Jullovsmorgon with Ulf Turesson and Katti Bohman
1997/1998 – Jullovsmorgon with Eva Melander and Andreas Tottie
1998/1999 – Jullovsmorgon with Bella och Theo
1999/2000 – Änglar på rymmen
2000/2001 – Jullovsmorgon
2001/2002 – Det spökar i jullovsmorgon
2002/2003 – Expedition Kekkaluokta
2003/2004 – Jullovsmorgon från TV-skeppet
2004/2005 – Jonas jullov
2005/2006 – Jullovsmorgon
2006/2007 – Häxan Surtant
2007/2008 – Budfirman Bums jullov
2008/2009 (LAST) – Träskändan

See also 
Sommarlovsmorgon
Sveriges Radio's Christmas Calendar
Sveriges Television's Christmas Calendar

References 

Swedish children's television series
Sveriges Television original programming